A building, or edifice, is an enclosed structure with a roof and walls standing more or less permanently in one place, such as a house or factory (although there's also portable buildings). Buildings come in a variety of sizes, shapes, and functions, and have been adapted throughout history for a wide number of factors, from building materials available, to weather conditions, land prices, ground conditions, specific uses, prestige, and aesthetic reasons. To better understand the term building compare the list of nonbuilding structures.

Buildings serve several societal needs – primarily as shelter from weather, security, living space, privacy, to store belongings, and to comfortably live and work. A building as a shelter represents a physical division of the human habitat (a place of comfort and safety) and the outside (a place that at times may be harsh and harmful).

Ever since the first cave paintings, buildings have also become objects or canvasses of much artistic expression. In recent years, interest in sustainable planning and building practices has also become an intentional part of the design process of many new buildings and other structures.

Definition 

The word building is both a noun and a verb: the structure itself and the act of making it. As a noun, a building is 'a structure that has a roof and walls and stands more or less permanently in one place'; "there was a three-storey building on the corner"; "it was an imposing edifice". In the broadest interpretation a fence or wall is a building. However, the word structure is used more broadly than building including natural and man-made formations and does not necessarily have           walls. Structure is more likely to be used for a fence. Sturgis' Dictionary included that "[building] differs from architecture in excluding all idea of artistic treatment; and it differs from construction in the idea of excluding scientific or highly skilful treatment." As a verb, building is the act of construction.

Structural height in technical usage is the height to the highest architectural detail on building from street-level. Depending on how they are classified, spires and masts may or may not be included in this height. Spires and masts used as antennas are not generally included. The definition of a low-rise vs. a high-rise building is a matter of debate, but generally three stories or less is considered low-rise.

History 

There is clear, evidence of homebuilding from around 18,000 BC. Buildings became common during the Neolithic (see Neolithic architecture).

Types

Residential 

Single-family residential buildings are most often called houses or homes. Multi-family residential buildings containing more than one dwelling unit are called a duplex or an apartment building. A condominium is an apartment that the occupant owns rather than rents. Houses may also be built in pairs (semi-detached), in terraces where all but two of the houses have others either side; apartments may be built round courtyards or as rectangular blocks surrounded by a piece of ground of varying sizes. Houses which were built as a single dwelling may later be divided into apartments or bedsitters; they may also be converted to another use e.g. an office or a shop. hotels, especially of the extended stay variety (like apartels) can also be classed as residential.

Building types may range from huts to multimillion-dollar high-rise apartment blocks able to house thousands of people. Increasing settlement density in buildings (and smaller distances between buildings) is usually a response to high ground prices resulting from many people wanting to live close to work or similar attractors. Other common building materials are brick, concrete or combinations of either of these with stone.

Residential buildings have different names for their use depending if they are seasonal include holiday cottage (vacation home) or timeshare; size such as a cottage or great house; value such as a shack or mansion; manner of construction such as a log home or mobile home;, architectural style such as a mock castle or Victorian house, proximity to the ground or water such as Earth sheltering the earth sheltered house, stilt house, or houseboat \ floating home. Also if the residents are in need of special care, or society considers them to dangerous to have freedom,  there's residential total institutions such as nursing homes, orphanages, psychiatric hospitals or prison; or in group housing like barracks or dormitories.

Historically many people lived in communal buildings called longhouses, smaller dwellings called pit-houses and houses combined with barns sometimes called housebarns.

Buildings are defined to be substantial, permanent structures so other dwelling forms such as yurts, and motorhomes are dwellings but not buildings.

Commercial
A commercial building is one in which at least one business is based, but where people don't live. Examples include stores, restaurants, and hotels.

Industrial
Industrial buildings are those in which heavy industry is done, such as manufacturing. These edifices include warehouses and factories.

Agricultural
Agricultural buildings are the outbuildings located on farms, like barns.

Mixed use 
Some buildings incorporate several or multiple different uses, most commonly are those that combine commercial and residential uses.

Complex 

Sometimes a group of inter-related (and possibly inter-connected) builds are referred to as a complex – for example a housing complex,  educational complex, hospital complex, etc.

Creation 
The practice of designing, constructing, and operating buildings is most usually a collective effort of different groups of professionals and trades. Depending on the size, complexity, and purpose of a particular building project, the project team may include:

 A real estate developer who secures funding for the project;
 One or more financial institutions or other investors that provide the funding
 Local planning and code authorities
 A surveyor who performs an ALTA/ACSM and construction surveys throughout the project;
 Construction managers who coordinate the effort of different groups of project participants;
 Licensed architects and engineers who provide building design and prepare construction documents;
 The principal design Engineering disciplines which would normally include the following professionals: Civil, Structural, Mechanical building services or HVAC (heating Ventilation and Air Conditioning) Electrical Building Services, Plumbing and drainage. Also other possible design Engineer specialists may be involved such as Fire (prevention), Acoustic, façade engineers, building physics, Telecoms, AV (Audio Visual), BMS (Building Management Systems) Automatic controls etc. These design Engineers also prepare construction documents which are issued to specialist contractors to obtain a price for the works and to follow for the installations.
 Landscape architects;
 Interior designers;
 Other consultants;
 Contractors who provide construction services and install building systems such as climate control, electrical, plumbing, decoration, fire protection, security and telecommunications;
 Marketing or leasing agents;
 Facility managers who are responsible for operating the building.

Regardless of their size or intended use, all buildings in the US must comply with zoning ordinances, building codes and other regulations such as fire codes, life safety codes and related standards.

Vehicles—such as trailers, caravans, ships and passenger aircraft—are treated as "buildings" for life safety purposes.

Ownership and funding 
 Mortgage loan
 Real estate developer

Building services

Physical plant 

Any building requires a certain general amount of internal infrastructure to function, which includes such elements like heating / cooling, power and telecommunications, water and wastewater etc. Especially in commercial buildings (such as offices or factories), these can be extremely intricate systems taking up large amounts of space (sometimes located in separate areas or double floors / false ceilings) and constitute a big part of the regular maintenance required.

Conveying systems 

Systems for transport of people within buildings:

 Elevator
 Escalator
 Moving sidewalk (horizontal and inclined)

Systems for transport of people between interconnected buildings:

 Skyway
 Underground city

Building damage 

Buildings may be damaged during the construction of the building or during maintenance. There are several other reasons behind building damage like accidents such as storms, explosions, subsidence caused by mining, water withdrawal or poor foundations and landslides. Buildings also may suffer from fire damage and flooding in special circumstances. They may also become dilapidated through lack of proper maintenance or alteration work improperly carried out.

Hypothetical future buildings
Advances in construction technology, ideologies, etc may allow (or necessitate) the construction of new kinds of buildings and complexes, like an arcology.

See also 

 Autonomous building
 Commercial modular construction
 Earthquake engineering
 Float glass
 Green building
 Hurricane-proof building
 List of buildings and structures
 List of largest buildings in the world
 List of tallest buildings in the world
 Natural building
 Natural disaster and earthquake
 Skyscraper
 Steel building
 Tent

References

External links